Falak (literally "heaven," "fate," "universe") is a style of music native to the Pamir Mountains of Central Asia, particularly the Badakhshan region of northeastern Afghanistan, southeastern Tajikistan, and northern Pakistan. Falak lyrics can involve religious-mystical themes of divine love, separation and reunion (often drawn from Persian Sufi poetry), or secular and melancholy lyrics of human love and suffering.

Music theory
Falak music is generally in a descending scale, with a limited range often limited to a hexachord (six notes).

Instrumentation
Falak may be sung a cappella, accompanied by instruments, or instrumental. Falak instruments include the ghijak (spike fiddle), nay (Persian flute), and dombura (long-necked lute), as well as percussion instruments.

References

Central Asian music
Afghan music
Tajik music
Sufi music